Lati (also Romanized as Latī) is a village in Fakhrud Rural District, Qohestan District, Darmian County, South Khorasan Province, Iran. At the 2006 census, its population was 92, in 22 families.

References 

Populated places in Darmian County